Norma Foley (born 1970) is an Irish Fianna Fáil politician who has served as Minister for Education since June 2020. She has been a Teachta Dála (TD) for Kerry since 2020.

Local politics
Foley was previously a member of Kerry County Council for the Tralee local electoral area, serving from 1994 until her election to the Dáil in 2020. She also served as a member of Tralee Urban District Council until its abolition in 2014.

Parliamentary career
After failing in her bid to secure a nomination as a general election candidate in Kerry North in 2002, Foley was added to the Fianna Fáil ticket as Tom McEllistrim's running mate in the same constituency in 2007. She polled 4,937 first preference votes and finished fifth overall in the three-set constituency after being eliminated on the third count.

Foley again failed in her bid to secure a nomination as a general election candidate in 2016, but was a late addition to the ticket as a third Fianna Fáil candidate in the Kerry constituency in advance of the 2020 general election. She polled 6,856 first preference votes and secured the fifth and final seat at the expense of the her party colleague John Brassil on the eighth count. Johnnie Wall was co-opted to Foley's seat on Kerry County Council following her election to the Dáil. On her first day in the Dáil, Foley proposed her party leader Micheál Martin in his successful bid to become Taoiseach.

Minister for Education
Foley was appointed Minister for Education in June 2020 following the formation of a new coalition government, during the COVID-19 pandemic in Ireland. Her tenure to date has resulted in several gaffes, most prominently involving the COVID-19 impact on education and state examinations. In September 2020, Foley announced that two coding errors were identified in the Leaving Certificate calculated grades system. She apologised and announced that around 7,200 students were affected, receiving a higher grade than they should have while some students received a lower grade. It was later confirmed that a third error was identified.

In January 2021, Foley and the government were forced to abandon plans for Leaving Certificate students to attend school for three days a week, and instead students would return to homeschooling until February, after the ASTI directed its members not to return to in-school teaching. Also in January, Foley was forced to abandon plans to reopen special schools for thousands of children with special educational needs following safety concerns among staff unions. In February, Foley announced a new phase of planning for the Leaving Certificate exams, but the ASTI withdrew from discussions with the Department of Education after it said that the plan being developed would not provide a "meaningful Leaving Certificate" for students. In March, she lost her appeals against findings that two home-schooled students were unfairly excluded from the Leaving Certificate calculated grades process.

On 17 December 2022, she was re-appointed to the same position following Leo Varadkar's appointment as Taoiseach.

Personal life
Prior to becoming a TD, she was a teacher at Presentation Secondary School, Tralee. She is married to fellow teacher Denis Maguire. Her parents are Denis and Hannah Foley. Her father Denis Foley was a Fianna Fáil TD for Kerry North from 1981 to 1989 and 1992 to 2002.

References

External links
Norma Foley's page on the Fianna Fáil website

1970 births
Living people
Fianna Fáil TDs
Irish schoolteachers
Local councillors in County Kerry
Members of the 33rd Dáil
21st-century women Teachtaí Dála
People from Tralee
Ministers for Education (Ireland)
Women government ministers of the Republic of Ireland